Maysam Baou (born 19 September 1983) is a retired Iranian football player.

Club career
He started to shine when Shamushak was promoted to Persian Gulf Cup in 2003–04 season and moved to Esteghlal where he stayed for three seasons and became known after Tehran derby in 2004–05 season. He had an unsuccessful in UAE where he moved back to Iran and Rah Ahan halfway through. He moved to Aboomoslem the season after. He moved to Persepolis in summer 2009 and spending one season in Persepolis. In 2010, he moved to Shahrdari Tabriz and was one of the key players of the team in two seasons. After Shahrdari's relegation to the Azadegan League, Baou signed a three years contract with his former team, Esteghlal. He played for Esteghlal one season but he left the team after end of the season and joined to Tractor Sazi.

International career
He started his international career in WAFF 2007. He was called up again for Team Melli under Ali Daei in December 2008.

Honours

Club
Esteghlal
Iran Pro League (2): 2005–06, 2012–13

Persepolis
Hazfi Cup (1): 2009–10

Tractor Sazi
Hazfi Cup (1): 2013–14

Country
WAFF Championship (1): 2007

References

1983 births
Living people
Iranian footballers
Iran international footballers
Esteghlal F.C. players
Rah Ahan players
F.C. Aboomoslem players
Shamoushak Noshahr players
Persepolis F.C. players
Iranian expatriate footballers
Shahrdari Tabriz players
Tractor S.C. players
Esteghlal Khuzestan players
Persian Gulf Pro League players
Expatriate footballers in the United Arab Emirates
Iranian expatriate sportspeople in the United Arab Emirates
People from Qaem Shahr
Association football midfielders
Sportspeople from Mazandaran province